Runovo is a rural locality (a village) in Sosnovskoye Rural Settlement, Vologodsky District, Vologda Oblast, Russia. The population was 10 as of 2002.

Geography 
Runovo is located 23 km west of Vologda (the district's administrative centre) by road. Chernukhino is the nearest rural locality.

References 

Rural localities in Vologodsky District